The 2013 Vuelta a Castilla y León was the 28th edition of the Vuelta a Castilla y León cycle race and was held on April 12 through April 14, 2013. The race started in Arévalo and finished in Cervera de Pisuerga. The race was won by Rubén Plaza.

General classification

References

Vuelta a Castilla y León
Vuelta a Castilla y León by year
2013 in Spanish sport